Sour El Ghozlane District is a district of Bouïra Province, Algeria.

Municipalities
The district is further divided into 6 municipalities:
Sour El-Ghozlane
Maamora 
Ridane
El Hakimia
Dechmia
Dirrah

Districts of Bouïra Province